The Thoroughbred Breeders Stakes is a Victoria Racing Club Group 3 Thoroughbred horse race for fillies aged two years old, run at set weights with penalties, over a distance of 1200 metres. It is held at Flemington Racecourse in Melbourne, Australia in March during the VRC Autumn Racing Carnival. Total prize money for the race is A$200,000.

History

Name
 1971–1990 - Bloodhorse Breeders Plate
 1991–2000 - Bloodhorse Breeders Stakes
 2001 onwards - Thoroughbred Breeders Stakes

Distance
 1971–1972 - 7 furlongs (~1400 metres)
 1973–1995 – 1400 metres
 1996 onwards held over 1200 metres

Grade
 1971–1979 - Principal Race
 1980–1998 - Group 2
 1999 onwards - Group 3

Venue
In 2007 the race was run at Caulfield Racecourse due to reconstruction of Flemington Racecourse.

Winners

 2022 - Ruthless Dame
 2021 - La Rocque
 2020 - Minhaaj
 2019 - ^ Flit/ Ready Set Sail
 2018 - Khulaasa
 2017 - Shoals
 2016 - Thyme For Roses
 2015 - Pasadena Girl
 2014 - Clifton Red
 2013 - Montsegur
 2012 - Snitzerland
 2011 - Triple Asset
 2010 - Shaaheq
 2009 - My Emotion
 2008 - Oval Affair
 2007 - Rose Ceremony
 2006 - Nediym’s Glow
 2005 - Leveller
 2004 - One World
 2003 - Living Spirit
 2002 - Dama De Noche
 2001 - Balbina
 2000 - Crowned Glory
 1999 - Gilded Angel
 1998 - Glammis
 1997 - It’s A Giggle
 1996 - Zeya
 1995 - Hello Darl
 1994 - Mellow Chateau
 1993 - Fine Recipe
 1992 - Love Comes To Town
 1991 - Excited Angel
 1990 - Apollo Wonder
 1989 - Reganza
 1988 - Grey Fille
 1987 - Twining
 1986 - Wolvette
 1985 - Twirled
 1984 - Irradiate
 1983 - Truly Unfaithful
 1982 - Torn Monarch
 1981 - Rose Of Kingston
 1980 - Bagala Miss
 1979 - Lowan Star
 1978 - Outpace
 1977 - Red Cat
 1976 - Vivarchi
 1975 - Denise’s Joy
 1974 - Mulligatawny
 1973 - Hunza
 1972 - Sabot
 1971 - Gossiper

^ Dead heat

See also
 List of Australian Group races
 Group races

References

Horse races in Australia
Flemington Racecourse
Flat horse races for two-year-olds